Mário Tóth (born 6 April 1995) is a Slovak football defender who currently plays for Austrian club ASKÖ Klingenbach.

Club career

DAC Dunajská Streda
He made his professional Fortuna Liga debut for FK DAC 1904 Dunajská Streda against MFK Ružomberok on 26 July 2014.

References

External links
 
 Eurofotbal profile
 Mário Tóth at ÖFB

1995 births
Living people
Slovak footballers
Slovak expatriate footballers
Association football defenders
ŠK Senec players
AS Trenčín players
FC DAC 1904 Dunajská Streda players
MFK Karviná players
MFK Lokomotíva Zvolen players
Mosta F.C. players
FC Slovan Galanta players
Slovak Super Liga players
2. Liga (Slovakia) players
Maltese Premier League players
Footballers from Bratislava
Slovak expatriate sportspeople in the Czech Republic
Slovak expatriate sportspeople in Malta
Slovak expatriate sportspeople in Austria
Expatriate footballers in the Czech Republic
Expatriate footballers in Malta
Expatriate footballers in  Austria